Kazuki Hoshino (星野一樹 - Hoshino Kazuki; born October 13, 1977) is a Japanese professional racing driver. He is the son of former racing driver Kazuyoshi Hoshino. In 2013, Hoshino participated in the Blancpain Endurance Series with JRM Motorsport with Steven Kane and Peter Dumbreck.

Complete JGTC/Super GT results 
(key) (Races in bold indicate pole position) (Races in italics indicate fastest lap)

References 

1977 births
Living people
Japanese racing drivers
Super GT drivers
Formula Nippon drivers

Nürburgring 24 Hours drivers
B-Max Racing drivers